The 2013 Orlando City Soccer Club season was the club's third season of existence in Orlando.  Orlando finished second in the overall regular-season table. They were declared 2013 USL Pro Champions after beating Charlotte Eagles 7–4 in front of 20,886 fans at the Fifth Third Bank Field at the Citrus Bowl.

Background 

The first set of returning players was announced on November 7, 2012, including Jamie Watson, Miguel Gallardo, Rob Valentino, Anthony Pulis, Mechack Jérôme and Adama Mbengue. Notably not on the player list was captain Ian Fuller, who was only listed in the press release as "assistant head coach". He has been a player/coach the previous two seasons.

The biggest news regarding the fixture was the announcement of a home-and-away series of preseason friendlies with Tampa Bay Rowdies of the North American Soccer League. The teams will play on March 9 in Orlando, and March 30 in St. Petersburg. They could also potentially meet at the 2013 Walt Disney World Pro Soccer Classic.

In supporter news, the two largest supporters groups—The Ruckus, and the Iron Lion Firm—announced on November 18, 2012, that they were beginning discussions regarding the unification of the team's supporters groups.

Orlando City played a friendly against A.S. Roma of the Italian top-flight league Serie A on January 2, 2013. Roma was in town on a training visit to ESPN Wide World of Sports Complex. Roma won the match, 5–0.

As part of the alliance between Major League Soccer and the United Soccer Leagues, Orlando City agreed to become the USL Pro affiliate club of Sporting Kansas City. They were matched with Seattle Sounders, and will play home and away matches against their reserve squad in the 2013 season. The first loans made by Sporting Kansas City to Orlando City under the arrangement were forward Dom Dwyer, midfielder Christian Duke, defender Yann Songo'o and goalkeeper Jon Kempin.

On February 15, 2013, the team announced that Fifth Third Bank had purchased naming rights to the stadium for Orlando City matches. The Citrus Bowl will be called Fifth Third Bank Field at the Citrus Bowl during Orlando City matches.

Competitions

Friendlies 
The most important part of the preseason for Orlando City was a local derby with the 2012 North American Soccer League champion Tampa Bay Rowdies. It was the first meeting between minor-league professional soccer teams based in the Greater Orlando and Tampa Bay areas since 1990, when the Tampa Bay Rowdies and Orlando Lions played in the American Professional Soccer League.

The derby, referred to as the I-4 Derby after the road that connects the cities, was won by Orlando City, who took 3–2 victories in both matches, on March 9 in Orlando and March 30 in St. Petersburg. Additionally, the Lions also beat the Rowdies, 2–0, when they met in the 7th place game of the 2013 Walt Disney World Pro Soccer Classic on February 23.

WDW Pro Soccer Classic

I-4 Derby

USL Pro 

All times from this point on Eastern Daylight Time (UTC-04:00)

USL Pro regular season

Results summary

Results

Standings

USL Pro Playoffs

U.S. Open Cup 

Qualification for the U.S. Open Cup began in November 2012 in the fifth tier. The format will be similar to the 2012 tournament, but with the two lowest-ranked USL Pro teams and two expansion USL Pro teams starting in the first round, and the remaining USL Pro teams  (including Orlando City and NASL teams entering in the second round. On June 12, Orlando City reached the Quarterfinals, the farthest round ever reached in team history and the farthest USL Pro team in 2013, guaranteeing a $15,000 prize.

Club

Roster 
Players which have been announced as re-signed with Orlando or for which Orlando exercised an option to retain.

Squad information 

* = Denotes players who were retained after the move of the Austin Aztex FC organization to form Orlando City S.C.† = Denotes players on loan through USL Pro-MLS Reserve League alliance‡ = Retired as of May 30

Transfers

In

Out 
  John Rooney was signed by Barnsley F.C. on a free transfer after his contract with Orlando City for the 2012 season expired. There was a slight delay because of some concern that he was still under contract on 31 August.
  Mechack Jérôme was transferred to Sporting Kansas City on February 28.

Loan in 
 Yann Songo'o, on loan from Sporting Kansas City via the USL Pro-MLS Reserve League alliance Songo'o departed the team on June 28, 2013, when Sporting Kansas City released him from his contract.
 Dom Dwyer, on loan from Sporting Kansas City via the USL Pro-MLS Reserve League alliance Dwyer was recalled on June 27, 2013. Sporting Kansas City loaned Dwyer back for the 2013 USL Pro Championship. 
 Christian Duke, on loan from Sporting Kansas City via the USL Pro-MLS Reserve League alliance
 Jon Kempin, on loan from Sporting Kansas City via the USL Pro-MLS Reserve League alliance
 Renan Boufleur, on loan from Phoenix FC
 C. J. Sapong, on loan from Sporting Kansas City via the USL Pro-MLS Reserve League alliance
 Kevin Ellis, on loan from Sporting Kansas City via the USL Pro-MLS Reserve League alliance Ellis was briefly recalled by Sporting for a single match on July 12, then returned to Orlando.

Loan out

Media 
For the 2013 season, all matches will stream live on the USL Nation website using the stadium feed. Occasional matches will appear on Bright House Sports Network, with USL Nation using that feed when available. Some home matches can be heard on the radio as well, either 740 the Game or 102.5/107.7-HD2 WLOQ.

See also 
 2013 in American soccer
 2013 USL Pro season
 Orlando City

References 

2013 USL Pro season
2013
American soccer clubs 2013 season
2013 in sports in Florida